Sainte-Marguerite (Auvergnat: Senta Margarida) is a commune in the Haute-Loire  department and the Auvergne region of south-central France.

Geography
Sainte-Marguerite is located in the Parc naturel régional Livradois-Forez.

The Senouire flows southwest through the southeastern part of the commune.

The commune contains several hamlets, including Le Rif, La Vizade and Charbonnières.

Population

See also
 Communes of the Haute-Loire department

References

Communes of Haute-Loire